Southwest Township is one of ten townships in Crawford County, Illinois, USA.  As of the 2010 census, its population was 97 and it contained 43 housing units.

Geography

Unincorporated towns
 Landes

Cemeteries
The township contains these two cemeteries: Keplinger and Waggoner.

Demographics

School districts
 Oblong Community Unit School District 4
 Red Hill Community Unit School District 10

Political districts
 Illinois' 15th congressional district
 State House District 109
 State Senate District 55

References
 
 United States Census Bureau 2007 TIGER/Line Shapefiles
 United States National Atlas

External links
 City-Data.com
 Illinois State Archives

Townships in Crawford County, Illinois
Townships in Illinois